The Talaud Islands (Indonesian: Kepulauan Talaud) also spelled Talaur or Talaut, are a group of islands situated about 225 miles (360 km) northeast of Sulawesi, in Indonesia, north-east of the Sangihe Islands. The Talaud Islands are also the northernmost region of Eastern Indonesia, bordering south of the Philippines' Davao Region.
The group, with a total area of 483 square miles (1,251 square km), includes Karakelong (the largest), Salibabu, Kabaruan, and a small number of offshore islets. The seven tiny Nanusa Islands also lie north-east of Karakelong, with Miangas much further north-west.

Geography

Physical Geography

(*)The islands of the Talaud group are: (ordered from South to North) 
 Kabaruang Island
 Salibabu Island
 Sara Besar Island (off Salibabu's east coast)
 Nusa Dolong and Nusa Topor (off Karakelong's central west coast)
 Karakelong Island
 the Nanusa Islands: (ordered S to N) Kakalotan Island, Kakarotan Island, Intata Island, Magupu Island, Karatung Island, Merampit Island (largest) and Garat Island
 Miangas (not visible on map)
Grouping Talaud together with Sangihe, there are 77 islands in the Talaud-Sangihe archipelagos, of which 56 are inhabited.

Compared with the Sangihe archipelago, the islands are low lying and forested, with hills rising to 2,231 feet (680 metres). The coast of Karakelong Island is steep except on the southern shore, which is fringed by a wide reef.

The region is regularly rocked by large earthquakes and volcanic eruptions, as the Molucca Sea Plate is being consumed in both directions.                     A notable earthquake was the 2009 Talaud Islands earthquake, which was felt in the nearby Philippines.

Administration and Population 
The islands were declared a regency of North Sulawesi in 2000 as Kabupaten Kepulauan Talaud. Talaud's capital is Melonguane.

The population of the Talaud Islands was 94,520 according to the 2020 census. The total population of the Talaud, Sangihe and Sitaro Islands was 304,600 in 2020.

Both Sangihe and Talaud have small airstrips serviced by Express Air and Wings Air. Talaud Airport also serves as a transit point for flights to Miangas, one of the Indonesia's outlying islands located close to Davao, Philippines.

People and Culture 

Most of the population are involved in agriculture, which includes coconuts, vanilla, nutmeg, cloves, ebony and ironwood as well as copra and sago. Numerous volcanoes produce very fertile volcanic soil on many of the islands.

Fishing is also an extremely important aspect of Talaud livelihood, culture and economy.

The Austronesian Talaud language is spoken on the islands by the native ethnic group, the Talaud.

Christianity is the majority religion of the islands (protestantism).

Biodiversity 
The Talaud Islands are a hotspot of endemism and zoological diversity, and are situated in the Sulawesi lowland rain forests ecoregion.

Endemic mammals include the endangered Talaud flying fox (Acerodon humilis), the critically endangered Talaud bear cuscus (Ailurops melanotis),  the endangered Short-tailed Talaud mosaic-tailed rat (Melomys caurinus), and the endangered Long-tailed Talaud mosaic-tailed rat (Melomys talaudium).

Birds endemic to the Talaud Islands include the vulnerable Talaud bush-hen (Amaurornis magnirostris), the endangered Talaud rail (Gymnocrex talaudensis), the near threatened Talaud kingfisher (Todiramphus enigma) and the vulnerable Red-and-blue lory (Eos histrio), which formerly lived across the Talaud and Sangihe islands, now restricted only to Karakelang.

The Talaud black birdwing (Troides dohertyi) is a butterfly endemic to the Sangihe and Talaud Islands.

Sangihe and Talaud were largely deforested by 1920, and there is minimal natural forest remaining on these islands. A survey has been proposed to determine appropriate locations for additional protected areas around remaining forest (Stattersfield et al. 1998).

There is a Wildlife Reserve on Karakelong [246.69 km2 (95.25 miles2)].

Further reading

References

External links

WWF Sulawesi Lowland Rainforests Ecoregion

Archipelagoes of Indonesia
Islands of Sulawesi
Landforms of North Sulawesi
Populated places in Indonesia